Ma Chau island (not to be confused with Ma Shi Chau island), is an uninhabited outlying island of Hong Kong located in the Soko Islands group about 4km south to Lantau Island. 

Uninhabited islands of Hong Kong
Islands District
Islands of Hong Kong